Toronto Trilogy may refer to novel series by:

 An unfinished trilogy by Robertson Davies, of which the author completed two novels, Murther and Walking Spirits (1991) and The Cunning Man (1994).
Austin Clarke, a series consisting of The Meeting Point (1967), Storm of Fortune (1973) and The Bigger Light (1975)